St. Andrew's College is an institution of the Ukrainian Orthodox Church of Canada and is affiliated with the University of Manitoba in Winnipeg. The college exists to promote spiritual, academic, cultural and moral leadership within the Church, the Ukrainian Canadian community, and the Canadian community.

Originally established in 1946 in the north end of Winnipeg including the following programs:
 Academic programs in the Faculty of Theology
 Diploma in Theology (2 year program)
 Certificate in Theology (1 year program)
 Bachelor of Theology (4 year program)
 Master of Divinity (1 year program)
 High school program
 Ukrainian Cultural Summer Courses

History 
St. Andrew's College traces its beginnings to Pastoral Courses in Theology that were conducted in Saskatoon and Regina since 1918. In 1932, those courses evolved into Ukrainian Greek Orthodox Seminary and moved to Winnipeg. In 1962, St. Andrew's College became an associated college of the University of Manitoba. In 1964, the college moved to the university campus.  As courses in the Arts Faculty grew, the college became an affiliated College to the university in 1981 and established the Centre for Ukrainian Canadian Studies.

Principals of St. Andrew’s College
 1946 - 1950 - F. G. Hawryluk
 1950 - 1952 - G. Woloshynowski
 1952 - 1955 - Rt. Rev. Fr. Dr. S.W. Sawchuk
 1955 - 1958 - Rt. Rev. Fr. Dr. D.F. Stratychuk
 1958 - 1959 - V. Rev. Fr. H.D. Hrycyna
 1963 - 1968 - Rt. Rev. Fr. Dr. S.W. Sawchuk
 1968 - 1974 - Professor L. Tomaschuk
 1974 - 1975 - Justice Dr. J.R. Solomon
 1975 - 1978 - V. Rev. Fr. M. Yurkiwsky
 1978 - 1981 - Dr. P.A. Kondra
 1981 - 1984 - Rt. Rev. Fr. Dr. O. Krawchenko
 1984 - 1985 - Dr. R. Yereniuk
 1985 - 1986 - Rt. Rev. Fr. Dr. O. Krawchenko
 1986 - 1987 - Dr. O. Trosky
 1987 - 1988 - Rt. Rev. Fr. D. Luchak
 1988 - 1998 - Dr. R. Yereniuk
 1998 - 1999 - V. Rev. Fr. Roman W. Bozyk (Acting Principal)
 1999 - 2003 - Dr. V. Olender
 2003–present - V. Rev. Fr. Roman W. Bozyk (Acting Principal)

Books
 25-літній ювілей Колегії св. Андрея в Вінніпегу при Манітобськім університеті 1946–1971. - Вінніпег : [б. в.], 1971. - 45 с.
 John M (Jack) Bumsted "The University of Manitoba: An Illustrated History". Winnipeg: University of Manitoba Press 2001

References

External links
 St. Andrew's College web site

University of Manitoba
Ukrainian-Canadian culture in Manitoba
Ukrainian Orthodox Church of Canada
Ukrainian diaspora in Canada
Christian schools in Manitoba
Seminaries and theological colleges in Canada